Anam Tanveer is a Pakistani actress, TV host, and writer. She made her acting debut with a supporting role in the 2012 series Meray Dard Ko Jo Zuban Miley and since then appeared in television series including Joru Ka Ghulam (2014), Behkay Kadam (2014), Shehrnaz (2016), Waada (2016), and Jaal (2019).

Her dynamic performance was highly praised for playing the role of Fareeha in ARY Digital's Do Bol. Her dedication led her to an international nomination, she was nominated for Best Supporting Actress for a TV serial she did in 2017 (Noor-e-Zindegi) at the IPPA awards London (based on 2016 performance). She gained more popularity among local and neighbouring countries audience for her immaculate acting for playing the antagonist in Mera Dil Mera Dushman (based on 2019-2020 performance).

Television

Films
 Glass Tora Bara Aana (2018)
 Masoom Si Bholi Bhali Si (2019)
 Khalda Aur Walda (2017)
 Ek Aur Munafiq (2020)
 Dosra Chehra, Dikhawa Season 3 (2022)

References

External links

21st-century Pakistani actresses
Living people
Year of birth missing (living people)